The punctate flower chafer or spotted flower chafer, Neorrhina punctata, is a species of flower chafer. The chafers are beetles of subfamily Cetoniinae in the large scarab beetle family (Scarabaeidae). Among the chafers, N. punctatum belongs to the tribe Schizorhinini.

This beetle occurs in eastern mainland Australia, from Victoria, through New South Wales to northern Queensland.

It is also known under several other scientific names, but these are obsolete or misspelled:
 Cetonia punctatum (lapsus)
 Cetonia punctata Donovan, 1805
 Neorrhina punctatum (lapsus)
 Polystigma punctatum (lapsus)
 Polystigma punctata (Donovan, 1805)

References

Cetoniinae
Beetles of Australia
Beetles described in 1805